The 1939 Paris–Nice was the seventh edition of the Paris–Nice cycle race and was held from 16 March to 19 March 1939. The race started in Paris and finished in Nice. The race was won by Maurice Archambaud.

General classification

References

1939
1939 in road cycling
1939 in French sport
March 1939 sports events